Phyllis Glory McDonagh (7 January 1900 – 17 October 1978) was an Australian film producer, production designer and journalist, who often worked in collaboration with her sisters Paulette and Isabella.

Personal life 
McDongah was born on Macquaire Street in Sydney, Australia, on 7 January 1900 and was the second child of seven born to John Michael McDonagh, and wife Annie Jane (Anita), née Amora. She attended school at the Convent of the Sacred Heart, Elizabeth Bay, as a weekly boarder alongside her two sisters Isabella and Paulette.

On 15 October 1941, Phyllis married salesman Leo Francis Joseph O'Brien. She never had any children.

Phyllis McDongah died on 17 October 1978.

Career 
Phyllis McDonagh began her career in film alongside her two sisters Isabella and Paulette with the film Those Who Love in 1926. Phyllis as the production manager would work closely with her younger sister Paulette as director, to write scenarios which showed their older sister Isabel to great advantage.

Made on small budgets, these films were entertaining society melodramas of romance, sacrifice and parental opposition, set against an urban background: a contrast to the bush emphasis in contemporary Australian films. The sisters used the family's colonial home, Drummoyne House, and its antique and elaborate furnishings, to give their films great style at little expense.

The first two of the sisters feature films, Those Who Love and The Far Paradise, were both met with critical acclaim, while their third The Cheaters earned much lower reviews from both the public and critics due to its poor sound effects.

During the depression the sisters made several short sporting documentaries, including Australia in the Swim with 'Boy' Charlton and the Olympic swimming team, (Sir) Donald Bradman in How I Play Cricket and Phar Lap in The Mighty Conqueror. 

After leaving the film industry in the late 1930s, Phyllis became a journalist and moved to New Zealand becoming editor of New Zealand Truth. She later returned to Sydney with her husband and became a freelance journalist and short-story writer and then from 1960 worked as social editor on the North Shore Times.

Awards 
Phyllis McDonagh won the Longford Lyell Award in 1978, awarded to her by the Australian Academy of Cinema and Television Arts.  

Phyllis McDonagh was inducted onto the Victorian Honour Roll of Women in 2001.

Select filmography
 Those Who Love (1926)
 The Far Paradise (1928)
 The Cheaters (1930)
 Two Minutes Silence (1933)

References

External links
 
 Cuttings on Phyllis McDonagh at National Library of Australia
 Phyllis McDonagh at Australian Dictionary of Biography
 
 Victorian Honour Roll of Women

1900 births
1978 deaths
Australian production designers
Australian film producers
Women production designers
20th-century Australian women